CHUD.com, also known as Cinematic Happenings Under Development, was an American film review and film news website created by Nick Nunziata in 1999 which is currently owned by Bigfoot Entertainment. It was one of the longest-running sites of its kind.

References

External links

American film review websites
Television websites